Erica Marsha Bougard (born July 26, 1993) is an American heptathlete. She was NCAA indoor champion in 2013 and represented the United States at the 2013 World Championships.

Biography
Erica Bougard was born in Memphis, Tennessee, but grew up in Byhalia, Mississippi. Her first sport was basketball; she took up track and field at Byhalia High School. Erica Bougard won 2011 Mississippi High School Activities Association state outdoor track and field long jump title. Erica was the 2011 Mississippi state long jump leader.

Erica went to Mississippi State University on a track scholarship.

She won the heptathlon at the 2012 United States Junior Championships, scoring 5547 points; she trailed Kendell Williams through six events, but overtook her in the 800 meters. She made her international debut at the 2012 World Junior Championships in Barcelona, placing 13th. In the heptathlon, Bougard is strong in the five running and jumping events, but weak in the shot put and javelin throw.

As a sophomore, Bougard won the pentathlon at the 2013 NCAA indoor championships, scoring a school record 4399 points. At the outdoor NCAA meet she placed fourth in the heptathlon (with a personal best 5976 points) and sixteenth in the long jump. Two weeks later, she improved to 5990 points at the 2013 USA Outdoor Track and Field Championships, placing third and qualifying for the senior World Championships in Moscow. Bougard scored 5829 points at the World Championships, placing 24th.

At the 2014 NCAA indoor championships Bougard was second to Williams with 4586 points; both Williams and Bougard broke the previous collegiate record of 4569 points by Makeba Alcide. Outdoors, Bougard redshirted the collegiate season but broke 6000 points for the first time at the United States championships, repeating her third place from the previous year with 6118 points.

In 2015 Bougard again placed second to Williams at the NCAA indoor meet, this time with 4566 points; outdoors, she scored a personal best 6250 points at the SEC championships and entered the NCAA outdoor championships as the collegiate leader, but only placed fourth as Akela Jones won. At the 2015 USATF championships Bougard placed third for the third consecutive year, improving her best to 6288 points and qualifying for the World Championships in Beijing.

Three weeks later, Bougard placed seventh in heptathlon scoring 6070 points at 2016 United States Olympic Trials (track and field). She is openly lesbian.

Competition record

References

External links 

 
 
 
 Erica Bougard Byhalia High School Track & Field Results
 
 Erica Bougard track and field profile at Mississippi State University

1993 births
Living people
American heptathletes
Mississippi State Bulldogs women's track and field athletes
People from Byhalia, Mississippi
World Athletics Championships athletes for the United States
Sportspeople from Memphis, Tennessee
American LGBT sportspeople
LGBT track and field athletes
USA Outdoor Track and Field Championships winners
USA Indoor Track and Field Championships winners
LGBT African Americans
Athletes (track and field) at the 2020 Summer Olympics
Lesbian sportswomen
Olympic track and field athletes of the United States